Yağcı (derived from the Turkish word Yağ meaning oil) may refer to:

 Yağcı, Hocalar, village in the District of Hocalar, Afyonkarahisar Province, Turkey
 Yağcı, Vezirköprü, village in the Vezirköprü, Samsun Province, Turkey

People with the surname
 Mehmet Yağcı (born 1972), Australian male weightlifter
 Mücahit Yağcı (born 1973), Turkish weightlifter
 Selma Yağcı (born 1981), Turkish female boxer
 Semih Yağcı (born 1988), Turkish weightlifter
 Serkan Yağcı (born 1984), Turkish karateka

See also 
 Yağcılar (disambiguation)